Ken Smith (4 December 1938 Rudston, Yorkshire – 27 June 2003) was a British poet.

Life
The son of a farm labourer, Smith had an itinerant childhood. He attended Leeds University and studied with Geoffrey Hill where fellow students included Tony Harrison and Jon Silkin.

With Silkin, he later co-edited Stand magazine, from 1963 to 1972.

Moving to America in 1969, he taught at Slippery Rock State College, College of the Holy Cross, and Clark University.

He returned to England in 1973, teaching at Leeds University as the Yorkshire Arts Association Creative Writing Fellow from 1976 to 1978.
In 1977 he founded the South West Review literary magazine and remained the editor until 1979.

He married Annie Minnis in 1960; they had one son and two daughters, but the marriage dissolved.  In 1981, he married the poet and artist Judi Benson; he thus became stepfather to her son.

In 2018 Stand Magazine published a special Ken Smith celebration issue for what would have been his 80th birthday.

Awards
 1964 Gregory Award for The Pity
 Lannan Award, 1997
 1998 Cholmondeley Award

Works

Poetry
 Eleven Poems. Northern House. 1964.
 The Pity. Jonathan Cape 1967.
 
 Tristan Crazy, Bloodaxe, 1978. .
 Tales of the Hunter. Four Zoas. 1979.
 Grainy Pictures of the Rain. Truedog Press. 1981. .
 Abel Baker Charlie Delta Epic Sonnets. Bloodaxe. 1981. .

The House Of Numbers. Rolling Moss Press. 1985. 

A Book Of Chinese Whispers. Bloodaxe. 1987. .

Wire Through The Heart. Ister. 2001.

Prose 

 Frontwards In A Backwards Movie. Arc Publications. 1974. .
 Anus Mundi. Four Zoas. 1976. 
 Ten Poets In Leeds (programme notes for readings at Leeds Playhouse). 1978.
 The Joined Up Writing. the x press. 1980.
 The Queen's Dreams (short story) Harry Novak Books. 1986.
 Inside Time (with Dave Wait). Harrap. 1989.

Editor

References

External links
 "Ken Smith - Poetry Quartets", British council Arts
 Archival material at Leeds University Library
 

1938 births
2003 deaths
People from Bridlington
Alumni of the University of Leeds
British male poets
20th-century British poets
20th-century English male writers
Writers from Leeds